The 1999 TIG Classic was a women's tennis tournament played on outdoor hard courts in San Diego, California in the United States. It was part of Tier II of the 1999 WTA Tour. It was the 21st edition of the tournament and was held from August 2 through August 8, 1999. Second-seeded Martina Hingis won the singles title and earned $80,000 first-prize money. This edition of the tournament is notable as the last event Steffi Graf participated in before announcing her retirement.

Entrants

Seeds

Other entrants
The following players received wildcards into the singles main draw:
  Lisa Raymond
  Julie Halard-Decugis

The following players received wildcards into the doubles main draw:
  Iva Majoli /  Dominique Van Roost

The following players received entry from the singles qualifying draw:

  Fabiola Zuluaga
  Maureen Drake
  Meilen Tu
  Anke Huber

The following players received entry from the doubles qualifying draw:

  Janet Lee /  Vanessa Webb

Finals

Singles

 Martina Hingis defeated  Venus Williams 6–4, 6–0
 It was Hingis' 5th singles title of the year and the 24th of her career.

Doubles

 Lindsay Davenport /  Corina Morariu defeated  Serena Williams /  Venus Williams 6–4, 6–1

References

External links
 ITF tournament edition details
 Tournament draws

Toshiba Classic
Southern California Open
TIG Classic
1999 in American tennis